Ultraviolette Automotive is an Indian electric vehicle startup company based in Bangalore, India. it was founded by Narayan Subramaniam and Niraj Rajmohan in 2016.

History 
Ultraviolette Automotive was founded in 2016 by Narayan Subramaniam (CEO) and Niraj Rajmohan (CTO). Till 2022, the company has received $15 million Series C Funding from TVS Motor Company and Zoho Corporation. Other Investors are Malayalam film actor Dulquer Salmaan    and GoFrugal Technologies.

References 

14. "Ultraviolette F77 Electric super bike comes with three different varients-F77,F77 Recon,F77 Limited"- Evindias. Retrieved 2 December 2022.

External links
 

Electric vehicle infrastructure developers
Manufacturing companies based in Bangalore
2016 establishments in Karnataka
Electric vehicle battery manufacturers
Electric vehicle manufacturers of India
Battery electric vehicle manufacturers
Vehicle manufacturing companies established in 2016
Electric vehicle industry